The 2017 Buffalo Funds - NAIA Division I men's basketball tournament is being held in March at Municipal Auditorium in Kansas City, Missouri. The 80th annual NAIA basketball tournament features 32 teams playing in a single-elimination format. The opening game round started on March 15, and the National Championship Game was played on March 21.

Awards and honors
Leading scorer: Dion Rogers, 28 points.
Leading rebounder:
Frank Cramer Award: Randy Covitz, Kansas City Star
Dr. James Naismith-Emil S. Liston Sportsmanship Award: Biola (Calif.)
2017 All-Tournament Team: Michael Harris, Langston (Okla.), Jonathan Beausejour, Life (Ga.), Dalarian Williams, Life (Ga.), Brandon Moss, LSU Alexandria (La.), Brian Sylvester, LSU Alexandria (La.), Ryan Harris, Texas Wesleyan, Dion Rogers, Texas Wesleyan, Najeal Young, Texas Wesleyan, Charles Knowles, William Penn (Iowa), Torren Jones, William Penn (Iowa)
Player of the Year: Dalarian Williams (Life Ga.) 
Most consecutive tournament appearances: 26th, Georgetown (KY)
Most tournament appearances: 36th, Georgetown (KY)

2017 NAIA results
Texas Wesleyan won their 2nd national title, defeating Life University (Ga.) 86 to 76. It was Texas Wesleyan's 13th appearance in the NAIA Tournament. It was their 4th elite eight and final four, and second title game. 2017 was the 9th straight year without a back-to-back winner. Texas Wesleyan became the 16th program to win two or more national titles with its win. Life finished the season earning its second all-time runner-up title.

2017 NAIA bracket

  * denotes overtime.

See also
2017 NAIA Division I women's basketball tournament
2017 NCAA Division I men's basketball tournament
2017 NCAA Division II men's basketball tournament
2017 NCAA Division III men's basketball tournament
2017 NAIA Division II men's basketball tournament

References

NAIA Men's Basketball Championship
Tournament
NAIA Division I men's basketball tournament
NAIA Division I men's basketball tournament